Royce may refer to:

People

Surname
 Ed Royce (born 1951), American politician
 Elwyn E. Royce (1868–1960), American politician
 Henry Royce (1863–1933), cofounder of the Rolls-Royce automobile company
 Homer Elihu Royce (1820–1891), American lawyer, politician and jurist
 Josiah Royce (1855–1916), historian and idealist philosopher
 Kenneth W. Royce, American libertarian author
 Lionel Royce (1891–1946), Austrian-American actor of stage and screen
 Mike Royce (born 1964), American comedian, screenwriter and television producer
 Ralph Royce (1890–1965), United States Army Air Forces general during World War II
 Robert Royce (1914–2008), Australian botanist
 Ruth Royce (1893–1971), American vaudeville performer and silent film actress
 Simon Royce (born 1971), English footballer
 Robert Royce, (born 1969), Court Mediator and Arbitrator, International Court of Arbitration and Mediation Center
 Winston W. Royce (1929–1995), computer scientist

Given name
Royce D. Applegate (1939–2003), American actor and screenwriter
Royce Ayliffe, Australian rugby league footballer
Royce Berry (born 1946), American professional football defensive end
Royce Brownlie (born 1980), Australian football (soccer) player
Royce Campbell (born 1952), jazz guitarist
Royce Clayton (born 1970), American Major League Baseball shortstop
Royce de Mel, first indigenous commander of the Sri Lanka Navy
Royce Deppe (born 1965), South African tennis player
Royce Freeman (born 1996), American football player
Royce Frith (1923–2005), Canadian diplomat and politician 
Royce Gracie (born 1966), Brazilian jiu-jitsu master
Royce Hart (born 1948), Australian rules football player and coach
Royce Lewis (born 1999), American baseball player
Royce Money (born 1942), Chancellor and former president of Abilene Christian University
Royce Newman (born 1997), American football player
Royce Ryton (1924–2009), English playwright
Royce Simmons (born 1960), Australian rugby league coach and former player
Royce West (born 1952), Democratic member of the Texas Senate
Royce White (born 1991), American basketball player

Stage name 
 Prince Royce (born 1989), American singer and songwriter
 Royce da 5'9" (born 1977), American rapper and songwriter

Fictional characters
 Clarence Royce, on the HBO television drama The Wire
 Mitchell Royce, a comic book character by Warren Ellis
 Royce, in the 2010 film Predators, portrayed by Adrien Brody
 Royce Mumphrey, aka Cave Guy, from Freakazoid!
House Royce, a fictional family in George R. R. Martin’s A Song of Ice and Fire

Other uses
 Royce', a Japanese chocolate manufacturing company
 Royce watches, a Swiss watch company 
 Royce Brook, a creek in New Jersey
 Royce Hall, on the campus of the University of California, Los Angeles
 Royce (film), starring Jim Belushi
 Royce Peak, a mountain in California

See also
 Justice Royce (disambiguation)